Ngaire Tui Woods CBE (born ) is the founding dean of the Blavatnik School of Government and professor of Global Economic Governance at the University of Oxford. She founded the Global Economic Governance Programme (currently directed by Emily Jones) and is the co-founder (with Robert Keohane) of the Oxford–Princeton Global Leaders Fellowship programme. She was born in New Zealand.

Education
Woods attended Rangitoto College in Mairangi Bay, Auckland, where she was head girl in 1980. She then attended the University of Auckland where she graduated with a Bachelor of Arts degree in economics and a Bachelor of Laws degree. She studied at Balliol College, Oxford, as a Rhodes Scholar, completing Master of Philosophy and Doctor of Philosophy degrees in international relations.

From 1990 to 1992, she was a junior research fellow at New College, Oxford, and subsequently taught at the Government Department at Harvard University before taking up her fellowship at University College, Oxford.

Career
Woods was named inaugural Dean of the Blavatnik School of Government in 2011. Her research focuses on global economic governance, the challenges of globalization, global development, and the role of international institutions.

Since 2013, Woods has written monthly commentaries on economic and regulatory policy for Project Syndicate, an international media organization.

In early 2021, Woods was appointed by the G20 to the High Level Independent Panel (HLIP) on financing the global commons for pandemic preparedness and response, co-chaired by Ngozi Okonjo-Iweala, Tharman Shanmugaratnam and Lawrence Summers.

In late 2021, Woods attended the World Economic Forum's Great Narrative Meeting stating:

She then went on to say:

Personal life 
Woods is married to the American-born, University of Oxford professor Eugene Rogan.

Other activities

Corporate boards
 Arup, non-executive member of the board of directors
 Rio Tinto, independent non-executive director

Non-profit organizations
 Asian Infrastructure Investment Bank (AIIB), member of the international advisory panel 
 Mo Ibrahim Foundation, member of the board
 Oxonia, member of the academic and policy board
 Ditchley Foundation, member of the board of governors 
 Rhodes Trust, member of the board of trustees (since 2009) 
 Center for Global Development, member of the advisory group
 Center for International Governance Innovation, member of the board  
 Europaeum, member of the board of trustees 
 World Economic Forum (WEF), co-chair of the Global Future Council on Technology, Values and Policy
 Trilateral Commission, member of the European Group

In the past, Ngaire Woods has served as an advisor to the IMF board, to the UNDP Human Development Report, and to the Commonwealth Heads of Government. She is a former regular presenter of the Analysis programme for BBC Radio 4, and in 1998 presented her own BBC television series on public policy. She has also served as a member of the IMF European Regional Advisory Group.

Books
Woods, N. The Globalizers: the IMF, the World Bank, and their Borrowers, Cornell University Press, March 2006; 
Woods, N. The Political Economy of Globalization, Macmillan, 2000
Woods, N. "Exporting Good Governance: Temptations and Challenges in Canada's Aid Program" (with Jennifer Welsh, Laurier University Press, 2007) 
Woods, N. "Making Self-Regulation Effective in Developing Countries" (with Dana Brown, Oxford University Press, 2007)
Woods, N. (Editor) Explaining International Relations since 1945, Oxford University Press, 1996; 
Woods, N. (Co-Author) Inequality, Globalization, and World Politics, Oxford University Press, 1999; 
Mattli, W and Woods, N (Co-Author) The Politics of Global Regulation, Princeton University Press March 2009;

References

External links
 Blavatnik School of Government, University of Oxford
 Global Economic Governance Program

1960s births
Living people
British economists
British women economists
Fellows of University College, Oxford
Fellows of New College, Oxford
New York University faculty
Harvard University faculty
New Zealand Rhodes Scholars
University of Auckland alumni
Rhodes Trustees
Alumni of Balliol College, Oxford
Academics of the University of Oxford
Commanders of the Order of the British Empire
Deans (academic)
Women deans (academic)